Dirkie Chamberlain (born 3 November 1986) is a South African field hockey player.

International career 
The affable player is a 1x Olympian, played 4 World Cups, 3 Commonwealth Games. 

At the 2012 Summer Olympics she competed with the South Africa women's national field hockey team in the women's tournament.  She has also competed at the 2010 and 2014 Commonwealth Games. and 2018 Commonwealth Games.

Dirkie currently plays at the HGC. In the past, has also played various European leagues; with clubs including Holcombe Hockey Club, Kampong (Dutch Hoofdklasse), Canterbury HC (Investec English Premier League) and Gantoise HC (Belgium Honour Division).

Personal life 
She began playing hockey when she was 13. Dirkie is openly lesbian.

References

External links

Dirkie Chamberlain at the England Hockey
Dirkie Chamberlain at the European Hockey Federation

1986 births
Living people
Field hockey players at the 2012 Summer Olympics
Olympic field hockey players of South Africa
South African female field hockey players
Field hockey players at the 2014 Commonwealth Games
Commonwealth Games competitors for South Africa
Sportspeople from Pretoria
Field hockey players at the 2010 Commonwealth Games
Field hockey players at the 2018 Commonwealth Games
Female field hockey forwards
Holcombe Hockey Club players
HGC players
SV Kampong players
South African LGBT sportspeople

LGBT field hockey players